Tim Merlier (born 30 October 1992) is a Belgian cyclist who currently rides for UCI WorldTeam . In 2019, he was the winner of the Belgian National Road Race Championships.

He currently specializes as a sprinter and won stage 3 of the 2021 Tour de France. 

He rode at the men's elite event at the 2016 UCI Cyclo-cross World Championships in Heusden-Zolder.

Major results

Cyclo-cross

2009–2010
 1st  National Junior Championships
 1st Junior Bredene
 Junior Superprestige
1st Vorselaar
2011–2012
 Under-23 UCI World Cup
2nd Heusden-Zolder
 Under-23 Superprestige
2nd Hoogstraten
2012–2013
 1st Contern
 Under-23 Bpost Bank Trophy
1st Lille
 Under-23 Superprestige
3rd Hamme
2013–2014
 2nd Under-23 Kalmthout
 Under-23 Bpost Bank Trophy
3rd Loenhout
2014–2015
 1st Illnau
 1st Rhein-Neckar
 3rd Zonnebeke
 3rd Bredene
2015–2016
 DVV Trophy
2nd Loenhout
 Superprestige
3rd Gieten
2016–2017
 Brico Cross
3rd Maldegem
2017–2018
 Superprestige
2nd Middelkerke
 DVV Trophy
2nd Lille
 Brico Cross
3rd Maldegem
2019–2020
 2nd Wachtebeke
 2nd Otegem
 DVV Trophy
2nd Kortrijk
3rd Hamme
 Ethias Cross
2nd Bredene
2021–2022
 Coupe de France
3rd Troyes #2
2022–2023
 Exact Cross
1st Zonnebeke
 2nd Saint Sauveur de Landemont

Road

2015
 3rd Schaal Sels
2016
 1st Grote Prijs Stad Zottegem
 5th Ronde van Limburg
 9th Halle–Ingooigem
2017
 7th Dwars door het Hageland
2018
 Danmark Rundt
1st  Points classification
1st Stages 3 & 5
 3rd Ronde van Limburg
 5th Grote Prijs Marcel Kint
2019
 1st  Road race, National Championships
 1st Elfstedenronde
 Tour Alsace
1st  Points classification
1st Prologue (TTT), Stages 1 & 4
 1st Stage 5 Danmark Rundt
 2nd Antwerp Port Epic
 3rd Münsterland Giro
 5th Memorial Rik Van Steenbergen
 6th Dwars door het Hageland
 6th Omloop Mandel-Leie-Schelde
 7th Paris–Chauny
2020
 1st Brussels Cycling Classic
 1st Stage 6 Tirreno–Adriatico
 1st Stage 4 Tour of Antalya
 3rd Three Days of Bruges–De Panne
 4th Scheldeprijs
 5th Dwars door het Hageland
2021
 1st Bredene Koksijde Classic
 1st Le Samyn
 1st Grote Prijs Jean-Pierre Monseré
 1st Ronde van Limburg
 1st Elfstedenronde
 Giro d'Italia
1st Stage 2
Held  after Stages 2–4 & 8–9
 1st Stage 3 Tour de France
 Benelux Tour
1st Stages 1 & 4
 2nd Grote Prijs Marcel Kint
 2nd Grand Prix d'Isbergues
 3rd Dwars door Vlaanderen
 3rd Antwerp Port Epic
 7th Grote Prijs Jef Scherens
 7th Brussels Cycling Classic
 9th Dwars door het Hageland
2022
 1st  Road race, National Championships
 1st Classic Brugge–De Panne
 1st Nokere Koerse
 1st Memorial Rik Van Steenbergen
 1st Stage 2 Tirreno–Adriatico
 3rd  Road race, UEC European Championships
 3rd Bredene Koksijde Classic
 3rd Elfstedenronde
 6th Gent–Wevelgem
 6th Kampioenschap van Vlaanderen
 9th Scheldeprijs
 10th Ronde van Limburg
2023
 1st Nokere Koerse
 UAE Tour
1st  Points classification
1st Stages 1, 2 (TTT) & 6
 1st Stage 1 Paris–Nice
 1st Stage 1 Tour of Oman

Grand Tour general classification results timeline

References

External links

1992 births
Living people
Sportspeople from Kortrijk
Cyclists from West Flanders
Cyclo-cross cyclists
Belgian male cyclists
Belgian Tour de France stage winners
Belgian Giro d'Italia stage winners
20th-century Belgian people
21st-century Belgian people